Lechosław Michalak (born 22 September 1956) is a Polish former racing cyclist. He won the Tour de Pologne 1977.

References

External links

1956 births
Living people
Polish male cyclists
People from Żyrardów
Sportspeople from Masovian Voivodeship